Dr. h.c. Max Kade (13 October 1882, Steinbach near Schwäbisch Hall, Württemberg, Germany – 15 July 1967, Davos, Switzerland) was an emigrant from Germany to New York City who became successful in the pharmaceutical industry. Kade was committed to advancing German-American relations. He established a foundation in New York to promote scientific and technical progress and to further the peaceful coexistence of nations.

Life
Max Kade was born October 13, 1882, in Steinbach, a village near Schwäbisch Hall, Germany. His father was a partner in a machine factory and iron foundry. After finishing school, Kade completed a commercial apprenticeship in his father's business. Later he lived in Völklingen and Antwerp.  In 1904 he emigrated to North America, living first in Montreal, then moving to New York in 1907. With a partner, he founded Seeck & Kade Inc., a pharmaceutical company, which after 1911 he directed alone. The company had great success with its cough syrup "Pertussin".

On January 26, 1908, Kade married Annette Marie Baudais. They had no children. In the 1920s the couple began to lend their fortune to philanthropic and social causes. Great attention was bestowed upon his home city, Steinbach, which had become part of Schwäbisch Hall in 1930. Kade was also an art collector and a patron of the arts who made many valuable gifts to German museums.

In addition to his honorary citizenship of Steinbach (1929) and Schwäbisch Hall (1935), Max Kade received numerous honors from the universities he aided. He died on July 15, 1967, at the age of 85 years, during a stay at a health resort in Davos, Switzerland. He was buried in Steinbach.

Max Kade Foundation
In 1944, Kade and his wife founded the Max Kade Foundation in New York. Following World War II, the foundation concentrated primarily on the needs of war victims and rescuing works of art and other objects of the German cultural heritage. Later it shifted its focus to supporting university activities, in particular, German-American cultural relations. One of its primary goals involves the promotion of mutual understanding of the people and cultures of Germany and the United States. The foundation has funded research facilities, libraries, dormitories, meeting places, as well as German and German-American studies programs. Max Kade Houses or Institutes exist at 30 locations in the United States and 17 in Germany.

References

External links
IUPUI Max Kade German-American Center, Indiana University-Purdue University Indianapolis
Kade-Duesenberg German House and Cultural Center, Valparaiso University
Max Kade Center for Contemporary German Literature, Washington University in St. Louis
Max Kade Center for European and German Studies, Vanderbilt University
Max Kade Center for German-American Studies, University of Kansas
Max Kade Center for German Studies, Case Western Reserve University
Max Kade Center for German Studies, Lafayette College
Max Kade German-American Research Institute, Pennsylvania State University
Max Kade German Center, Dartmouth College
Max Kade German Cultural Center, University of Cincinnati
Max Kade German House, University of Kentucky
Max Kade German House, Oberlin College
Max Kade German House, University of Virginia
Max Kade Institute for German-American Studies, University of Wisconsin–Madison
Max Kade Writer/Scholar in Residence and Charlotte M. Craig Visiting Research Scholar, Rutgers University
Max Kade House, University of Michigan
Max Kade Institute for Austrian-German-Swiss Studies, University of Southern California
http://www.max-kade-haus.de/english_index.html, Max-Kade houses in Germany and Austria

1882 births
1967 deaths
German emigrants to the United States
20th-century American businesspeople